The 2017 European Beach Volleyball Championship was held from August 16 to August 20, 2017 in Jurmala, Latvia. The draw consisted of 32 men's & 32 women's teams, with  100,000 EUR prize money per gender. A 2,800 stadium was purpose built on Majori beach, with near capacity for most games.
EuroBeachVolley awarded as “Sports Event of the Year” from hand Raimonds Vējonis.

Men's tournament

Preliminary round

Pool A

|}

|}

Pool B

|}

|}

Pool C

 

|}

|}

Pool D

|}

|}

Pool E

|}

|}

Pool F

|}

|}

Pool G

|}

|}

Pool H

|}

|}

Knockout stage
A draw was held to determine the pairings.

Round of 24 

|}

Round of 16 

|}

Quarterfinals

|}

Semifinals

|}

Third place game

|}

Final

|}

Women's tournament

Preliminary round

Pool A

|}

|}

Pool B

|}

|}

Pool C

|}

|}

Pool D

|}

|}

Pool E

|}

|}

Pool F

|}

|}

Pool G

|}

|}

Pool H

|}

|}

Knockout stage
A draw was held to determine the pairings.

Round of 24

|}

Round of 16

|}

Quarterfinals

|}

Semifinals

|}

Third place game

|}

Final

|}

References

External links
Official Website
Men's tournament - Results
Women's tournament - Results

European Beach Volleyball Championships
European Beach Volleyball
European Beach Volleyball
International volleyball competitions hosted by Latvia
Sport in Jūrmala